This is a list of all the United States Supreme Court cases from volume 525 of the United States Reports:

External links